Yuriy Tsyupyk (born ) is a Ukrainian male  track cyclist, and part of the national team. He competed at the 2007, 2008 and 2009 UCI Track Cycling World Championships.

References

External links
 Profile at cyclingarchives.com

1984 births
Living people
Ukrainian track cyclists
Ukrainian male cyclists
Place of birth missing (living people)